The Story of Alexander Graham Bell is a somewhat fictionalized 1939 biographical film of the famous inventor. It was filmed in black-and-white and released by Twentieth Century-Fox. The film stars Don Ameche as Bell and Loretta Young as Mabel, his wife, who contracted scarlet fever at an early age and became deaf.

The first half of the film concentrates on the hero's romantic, financial, and scientific struggle.

Henry Fonda is notable in a supporting role as Mr. Watson who hears the first words ever spoken over the telephone. In a pivotal scene, Bell (Don Ameche), while working on the telephone, accidentally spills acid onto his lap and shouts in pain, “Mr. Watson, come here! I want you!”. Watson, barely able to contain his own excitement, rushes into the room and stammers out the news that he heard Bell calling out to him over the telephone receiver.  Bell has Watson repeat his own words to him to confirm it, and the two men begin hopping around the room, with Watson yelling out a war whoop.

The last part depicts the legal struggle against Western Union over patent priority in the invention of the telephone, ending with a courtroom victory. The final scene has the hero contemplating crewed flight, under his wife's adoring gaze.

Cast
 Don Ameche as Alexander Graham Bell
 Loretta Young as Mrs. Mabel Hubbard Bell
 Henry Fonda as Thomas A. Watson 
 Charles Coburn as Gardiner Greene Hubbard 
 Gene Lockhart as Thomas Sanders 
 Spring Byington as Mrs. Hubbard 
 Sally Blane as Gertrude Hubbard 
 Polly Ann Young as Grace Hubbard 
 Georgiana Young as Berta Hubbard 
 Bobs Watson as George Sanders 
 Russell Hicks as Mr. Barrows 
 Paul Stanton as Chauncey Smith 
 Jonathan Hale as President of Western Union 
 Harry Davenport as Judge Rider 
 Beryl Mercer as Queen Victoria 
 Elizabeth Patterson as Mrs. Mac Gregor 
 Charles Trowbridge as George Pollard 
 Jan Duggan as Mrs. Winthrop 
 Claire Du Brey as Landlady 
 Harry Tyler as Joe Eliot 
 Ralph Remley as D'Arcy - Singer 
 Zeffie Tilbury as Mrs. Sanders
 Edward LeSaint as Banker at Demonstration (uncredited) 
 John Graham Spacey as Sir John Cowell (uncredited)

Plot 
The film opens on a get-together, a conversation arises about our main character Alexander Graham Bell (Don Ameche). The conversation was quite critical of bell with the general consensus being that he was a fool. When Bell enters, the party goers treat his intelligence and his demonstration of how sound works as a comedic party trick.

Bell is then introduced to a prospect of helping Gardiner Hubbard’s (Charles Coburn) deaf daughter with speech after showing him his capabilities of teaching a child born deaf to communicate using a glove with letters on it, to which Bell accepts the offer. On his way to the Hubbard house, Bell loses his balance when a young lady on a sled fly by him, he scolds her for being so reckless telling her that she could have ruined his telegraph instrument. When explaining his invention to Mr. Hubbard, Bell fails to capture his interest.

Mr. Hubbard introduces Bell to his daughters, including his deaf daughter, Mabel Hubbard (Loretta Young). The next day Bell and Mabel, while on a wagon ride, talk about Bell’s plans with the telegraph and Bell admits to Mabel that he is no longer interested in the telegraph and this is when he introduces the idea of the telephone.

After Bell is kicked out of his home, he moves into his assistant, Thomas Watson's (Henry Fonda) apartment. While trying to fine tune his invention, Bell discovers that he is missing a spring that Watson misplaced, or rather didn’t purchase because he bought something to eat instead. This leads to a heated argument that was short lived when Watson plucked the magnetized steel that sent a tune to the hand-held device that Bell was holding, that turned their anger and frustration into ecstatic joy for both men.

Bell makes his way to the Hubbard home to let everyone know of his monumental discovery. After telling Mabel of his discovery, he asks her to marry him and she accepted his proposal. Problems arise when he tells Mr. Hubbard, he tells Bell that he is not financially responsible enough to marry Mabel as he bounced from idea to idea, never finishing his previous tasks. Mabel pulls him aside and tells him to finish the telephone despite what her father said. Bell later laments about how is he going to build a receiver to interpret the vibrations sent through his contraption. He develops an idea through the concept of how human ears interprets sound finally developing a receiver in the process.

Bell placed water in the receiver cup to try and transmit the sound. When the water was unsuccessful, he added a small amount of Sulfuric acid to turn the water into a conductor. In the process, Bell spills acid on his leg and shouting in the receiver “Mr. Watson, come here, I want you!” to which Watson finally hears Bell through the telephone for the first time.

Bell later sets up a public demonstration of the telephone, the invention was received with laughter and ridicule, but that did not stop Bell. Soon there were hundreds of phones, but there was still a problem, Bell and the Hubbard’s were losing money. One offer arose that might help with the financial problem, England requested that Bell present the telephone to Queen Victoria (Beryl Mercer). Bells idea was that if he could convince the Queen to install a telephone in her palace, then the whole world would follow suit.

After a very successful demonstration the Queen has one installed in Buckingham Palace. Bell arrives back at the hotel to tell Mabel of the great news but is only met with more bad news. Mabel tells Bell that a new company organized by the Western Union is trying to claim ownership of the invention of the telephone. Bell files a lawsuit against American Speaking Telephone Company. During the proceedings, American Speaking Telephone Company alleges that Bell had a fraudulent patent and that one of their engineers was the actual inventor. The judge tells Bell that he is going to give him some time to find any sort of paperwork that proves he is the inventor. Bell, thinking he lost, decided to go home but Mabel arrives at the last minute to deliver the paper that proved Bell’s claim to the telephone. As the court goes into consideration, Bell still thinks that he lost the case. Out of nowhere Western Union representatives show up to tell him that they are dropping the suit. They conducted an internal investigation where they found that the engineer fabricated the claim to make both Western Union and Bell look bad. They then release all ownership of the telephones that they owned to Bell. They then offered that if Bell let them continue to use the telephones, they would offer a very valuable business partnership. Bell accepts their offer making him a very rich man.

Reception 
The film released to widespread critical acclaim with Nelson B. Bell of The Washington Post states that the film "Moves Notable Audience To Enthusiastic Applause. ...is splendidly cast.", he also states that this film is Don Ameches "his best work by far that he has brought to the celluloids." Mae Tinee of the Chicago Daily Tribune raves that the film is "Another finely etched biography" as well as stating that "Loretta Young is lovely and loveable as Bell's great white light", ending the article "As for staging, direction, costumes, photography—the best, my friends, the BEST!"

Accolades
The film was nominated for the American Film Institute's 2006 list AFI's 100 Years...100 Cheers.

See also

List of films featuring the deaf and hard of hearing

References

External links 
 
 
 
 

1939 films
1930s biographical films
20th Century Fox films
American biographical films
American black-and-white films
Cultural depictions of Alexander Graham Bell
1930s English-language films
Films directed by Irving Cummings
Films produced by Darryl F. Zanuck
Films scored by Ernst Toch
Films set in Boston
Films set in London
Films set in England
Films set in the 1870s
Films with screenplays by Lamar Trotti
1930s American films
Films about disability